Pablo's Inferno is a five-issue indie comic limited series created and produced by Rhode Montijo. The comic owes its title to Inferno, the first cantica of Dante Alighieri's Divine Comedy, and according to Montijo is something of a parody:

Plot 
The comic follows the story of Pablo, a young boy whose life is ended in an unfortunate hit-and-run accident, ends up in hell and has to traverse the underworld in search of answers. Along the way he meets several colorful characters such as Quetzal, an ancient Aztec god, and El Calambre, the ghost of a once-famous masked wrestler.

Film Possibilities 
As the comic's popularity continued to grow, Montijo was often questioned on the possibility of a Pablo's Inferno film adaption. Although open to the idea, he is doubtful of the outcome:

References

External links 
 Official Website
 Pablo's Inferno Blog

American comics titles
Comics publications